SG Rommerz or SG Blau-Weiss Rommerz is a German association football club based in Rommerz, near Neuhof in Hesse. The club was founded in 1920 and currently plays in the tier nine Kreisliga A Fulda.

In August 2006, Rommerz hosted Bundesliga side Eintracht Frankfurt and was beaten 1–11.

External links
  

Football clubs in Germany
Football clubs in Hesse
Association football clubs established in 1920
1920 establishments in Germany